Dêngqên County སྟེང་ཆེན་རྫོང་། is a county of Chamdo City in the east of the Tibet Autonomous Region.

Transport

China National Highway 317

Climate

References

Counties of Tibet
Chamdo